The 2014 Pacific hurricane season was an event in the annual cycle of tropical cyclone formation. It officially began on May 15 in the eastern Pacific—defined as the region east of 140°W—and began on June 1 in the central Pacific, defined as the region west of 140°W to the International Date Line; both ended on November 30.

The season produced twenty-three tropical depressions. All but one further intensified into tropical storms and sixteen further intensified to become hurricanes, which broke the record holding the most number of hurricanes within the basin tied with the 1990 and 1992 seasons. The first named storm of the season, Amanda, developed on May 22 before intensifying into a hurricane on May 24. At 0300 UTC on May 25, it intensified into Category 3 on the Saffir–Simpson hurricane wind scale, becoming the second-earliest major hurricane on record, behind Hurricane Bud (2012). In mid-June, Hurricane Cristina intensified to become the earliest second major hurricane on the record in the East Pacific, beating the previous record set by Hurricane Darby in 2010. On August 24, Hurricane Marie became the first Category 5 Pacific hurricane since Hurricane Celia in 2010, and it was the sixth most intense Pacific hurricane on record in terms of minimum atmospheric pressure.

This timeline includes information that was not operationally released, meaning that data from post-storm reviews by the National Hurricane Center, such as a storm that was not operationally warned upon, has been included. The timeline also documents tropical cyclone formations, strengthening, weakening, landfalls, extratropical transition, and dissipations during the season.

Timeline

May
May 15
04:00 UTC (9:00 p.m. PDT May 14) – The 2014 Pacific hurricane season officially begins.
May 22
May 23
18:00 UTC (11:00 a.m. PDT) – Tropical Depression One-E intensifies into Tropical Storm Amanda.
May 24
12:00 UTC (5:00 a.m. PDT) – Tropical Storm Amanda intensifies into a Category 1 hurricane on the Saffir–Simpson hurricane wind scale, becoming the first hurricane of the season.
May 25

00:00 UTC (5:00 p.m. PDT May 24) – Hurricane Amanda intensifies into a Category 2 hurricane.
06:00 UTC (11:00 p.m. PDT May 24) – Hurricane Amanda rapidly intensifies into a Category 4 hurricane.
May 26
18:00 UTC (11:00 a.m. PDT) – Hurricane Amanda weakens to a Category 3 hurricane.
May 27
12:00 UTC (5:00 a.m. PDT) – Hurricane Amanda weakens to a Category 2 hurricane.
May 28
00:00 UTC (5:00 p.m. PDT May 27) – Hurricane Amanda weakens to a Category 1 hurricane.
12:00 UTC (5.00 a.m. PDT) – Hurricane Amanda weakens to a tropical storm.
May 29
18:00 UTC (11:00 a.m. PDT) – Tropical Depression Amanda dissipates.

June
June 2
June 3

June 4
18:00 UTC (11:00 a.m. PDT) – Tropical Depression Boris degenerates to a remnant area of low pressure and dissipates a short time later over the Gulf of Tehuantepec.
June 9
June 10
06:00 UTC (11:00 p.m. PDT June 9) – Tropical Depression Three-E intensifies into Tropical Storm Cristina.
June 11
06:00 UTC (11:00 p.m. PDT June 10) – Tropical Storm Cristina intensifies into a Category 1 hurricane.
June 12

00:00 UTC (5:00 p.m. PDT June 11) – Hurricane Cristina intensifies into a Category 2 hurricane.
06:00 UTC (11:00 p.m. PDT June 11) – Hurricane Cristina rapidly intensifies into a Category 3 hurricane, becoming the earliest second major hurricane on record in the East Pacific.
June 13
00:00 UTC (5:00 p.m. PDT June 12) – Hurricane Cristina weakens to a Category 3 hurricane.
06:00 UTC (11:00 p.m. PDT June 12) – Hurricane Cristina weakens to a Category 2 hurricane.
18:00 UTC (11:00 a.m. PDT) – Hurricane Cristina weakens to a Category 1 hurricane.
June 14
12:00 UTC (5:00 a.m. PDT) – Hurricane Cristina weakens to a tropical storm roughly.
June 15
June 28
June 30

00:00 UTC (5:00 p.m. PDT June 29) – Tropical Depression Four-E intensifies into Tropical Storm Douglas.

July
July 1
July 2
00:00 UTC (5:00 p.m. PDT July 1) – Tropical Storm Elida weakens to a tropical depression.
July 3
06:00 UTC (11:00 p.m. PDT July 2) – Tropical Depression Elida degenerates to a remnant area of low pressure south of Zihuatanejo, Mexico.
July 6
06:00 UTC (11:00 p.m. PDT July 5) – Tropical Storm Douglas degenerates into a remnant low.
July 7

18:00 UTC (11:00 a.m. PDT) – Tropical Depression Six intensifies to Tropical Storm Fausto.
July 9
00:00 UTC (5:00 p.m. PDT July 8) – Tropical Storm Fausto weakens to a tropical depression.
12:00 UTC (5:00 a.m. PDT) – Tropical Depression Fausto dissipates.
July 17
July 18
July 19
July 25
06:00 UTC (11:00 p.m. PDT July 24) – Tropical Depression Seven-E intensifies into Tropical Storm Genevieve.
July 26
12:00 UTC (5:00 a.m. PDT) – Tropical Storm Genevieve weakens to a tropical depression.
July 27
09:00 UTC (2:00 a.m. PDT) – Tropical Depression Genevieve crosses 140°W, leaving the jurisdiction of the National Hurricane Center and entering the area monitored by the Central Pacific Hurricane Center.
July 28

00:00 UTC (2:00 p.m. HST July 27) – Tropical Depression Genevieve degenerates to a remnant low.
06:00 UTC (11:00 p.m. PDT July 27) – Hurricane Hernan weakens to a tropical storm.
July 29
18:00 UTC (8:00 a.m. HST) – The remnants of Genevieve regenerate to a tropical depression.
July 31
12:00 UTC (5:00 a.m. PDT) – Tropical Depression Nine-E develops from an area of low pressure.
18:00 UTC (11:00 a.m. PDT) – Tropical Depression Nine-E intensifies into Tropical Storm Iselle.

August
August 1
00:00 UTC (2:00 p.m. HST June 31) – Tropical Depression Genevieve degenerates to a disturbance southeast of the Hawaiian Islands.
August 2
00:00 UTC (5:00 p.m. PDT August 1) – Tropical Storm Iselle intensifies into a Category 1 hurricane.
12:00 UTC (2:00 a.m. HST) – The remnants of Genevieve regenerate to a tropical depression for a second time.
18:00 UTC (8:00 a.m. HST) – Tropical Depression Genevieve strengthens to tropical storm intensity for a second time.
18:00 UTC (11:00 a.m. PDT) – Hurricane Iselle intensifies into a Category 2 hurricane.
August 3
00:00 UTC (2:00 p.m. HST August 2) – Tropical Storm Genevieve weakens for a second time to a tropical depression.
12:00 UTC (5:00 a.m. PDT) – Hurricane Iselle intensifies into a Category 3 hurricane.
August 4
06:00 UTC (11:00 p.m. PDT August 3) – Tropical Depression Ten-E intensifies into Tropical Storm Julio.
12:00 UTC (5:00 a.m. PDT) – Hurricane Iselle intensifies into a Category 4 hurricane.
August 5
06:00 UTC (11:00 p.m. PDT August 4) – Hurricane Iselle weakens to a Category 3 hurricane.
18:00 UTC (8:00 a.m. HST) – Tropical Depression Genevieve intensifies into a tropical storm for a third time.
18:00 UTC (11:00 a.m. PDT) – Hurricane Iselle weakens to Category 2 intensity.
August 6

00:00 UTC (5:00 p.m. PDT August 5) – Hurricane Iselle crosses 140°W, leaving the National Hurricane Center's area of responsibility and entering the area monitored by the Central Pacific Hurricane Center.
06:00 UTC (11:00 p.m. PDT August 5) – Tropical Storm Julio strengthens into a Category 1 hurricane.
12:00 UTC (2:00 a.m. HST) – Tropical Storm Genevieve intensifies into a Category 1 hurricane.
August 7
00:00 UTC (2:00 p.m. HST August 6) – Hurricane Genevieve rapidly intensifies to a Category 3 hurricane.
03:00 UTC (5:00 p.m. HST August 6) – Hurricane Genevieve rapidly strengthens to Category 4 intensity as it crosses the International Date Line (180°), entering the western Pacific basin monitored by the Japan Meteorological Agency, and it is reclassified as Typhoon Genevieve.
06:00 UTC (11:00 p.m. PDT August 6) – Hurricane Julio attains Category 2 intensity.
12:00 UTC (2:00 a.m. HST) – Hurricane Iselle weakens to a Category 1 hurricane.
August 8
00:00 UTC (5:00 p.m. PDT August 7) – Hurricane Julio intensifies into a Category 3 hurricane, becoming the fourth major hurricane of the season.
06:00 UTC (8:00 p.m. HST August 7) – Hurricane Iselle weakens to a tropical storm.
12:00 UTC (2:00 p.m. HST) – Hurricane Julio weakens to Category 2 intensity.
12:30 UTC (2:30 a.m. HST) – Tropical Storm Iselle makes landfall along the Big Island's Kau Coast.
August 9
06:00 UTC (8:00 p.m. HST August 8) – Tropical Storm Iselle degenerates to a remnant area of low pressure.
August 10
00:00 UTC (2:00 p.m. HST August 9) – Hurricane Julio weakens to a Category 1 hurricane.
August 12
00:00 UTC (2:00 p.m. HST August 11) – Hurricane Julio weakens to a tropical storm.
August 13
00:00 UTC (2:00 p.m. HST August 12) – Tropical Storm Julio reintensifies to a Category 1 hurricane.
12:00 UTC (5:00 a.m. PDT) – Tropical Depression Eleven-E intensifies into Tropical Storm Karina.
August 14
06:00 UTC (8:00 p.m. HST August 13) – Hurricane Julio weakens to a tropical storm for a second time.
18:00 UTC (11:00 a.m. PDT) – Tropical Storm Karina intensifies to a Category 1 hurricane.
August 15
00:00 UTC (5:00 p.m. PDT August 16) – Hurricane Karina weakens to a tropical storm.
12:00 UTC (2:00 a.m. HST) – Tropical Storm Julio weakens to a tropical depression.
18:00 UTC (8:00 a.m. HST) – Tropical Depression Julio degenerates to a remnant low.
August 17
August 18
18:00 UTC (11:00 a.m. PDT) – Tropical Depression Twelve-E intensifies to Tropical Storm Lowell.
August 21
August 22

00:00 UTC (5:00 p.m. PDT August 21) – Hurricane Lowell weakens to a tropical storm.
06:00 UTC (11:00 p.m. PDT August 21) – Tropical Depression Thirteen-E intensifies to Tropical Storm Marie.
18:00 UTC (11:00 a.m. PDT) – Tropical Storm Karina reintensifies to a Category 1 hurricane.
August 23
06:00 UTC (11:00 p.m. PDT August 22) – Tropical Storm Marie intensifies to a Category 1 hurricane.
August 24

00:00 UTC (5:00 p.m. PDT August 23) – Tropical Storm Lowell weakens to a tropical depression.
00:00 UTC (5:00 p.m. PDT August 23) – Hurricane Marie intensifies to a Category 2 hurricane.
06:00 UTC (11:00 p.m. PDT August 23) – Hurricane Karina weakens to a tropical storm.
06:00 UTC (11:00 p.m. PDT August 23) – Hurricane Marie rapidly intensifies to a Category 4 hurricane.
August 25
00:00 UTC (5:00 p.m. PDT August 24) – Hurricane Marie weakens to Category 4 hurricane.
12:00 UTC (5:00 a.m. PDT) – Tropical Storm Karina weakens to a tropical depression.
August 26
00:00 UTC (5:00 p.m. PDT August 25) – Hurricane Marie weakens to a Category 3 hurricane.
06:00 UTC (11:00 p.m. PDT August 25) – Hurricane Marie weakens to a Category 2 hurricane.
18:00 UTC (11:00 a.m. PDT) – Tropical Depression Karina degenerates into a remnant low.
August 27
00:00 UTC (5:00 p.m. PDT August 26) – Hurricane Marie weakens to a Category 1 hurricane.
18:00 UTC (11:00 a.m. PDT) – Hurricane Marie weakens to a tropical storm.
August 28
18:00 UTC (11:00 a.m. PDT) – Tropical Storm Marie degenerates to a remnant area of low pressure.
August 29

September
September 2
12:00 UTC (5:00 a.m. PDT) – The remnants of Marie dissipate.

September 4

September 6

September 7

September 8

September 10

September 11

September 13

September 14

September 15

September 16

September 17

 18:00 UTC (11:00 a.m.

September 18
September 22
September 24

September 25
September 27
September 29
September 30

October
October 1
October 2
October 4

October 5
October 6
October 7
October 8
October 13
October 14
October 17

October 18
October 19
October 20
October 30

November
November 2
November 3

November 4
November 5
November 30
04:00 UTC (8:00 p.m. PST) – The 2014 Pacific hurricane season officially ends.

See also

 List of Pacific hurricanes
Timeline of the 2014 Pacific typhoon season
Timeline of the 2014 Atlantic hurricane season

Notes

References

External links

 The National Hurricane Center (NHC)'s 2014 Tropical Cyclone Advisory Archive
 The National Hurricane Center (NHC)'s Tropical Cyclone Reports for the 2014 Eastern Pacific Hurricane Season

2014 Pacific hurricane season
Pacific hurricane meteorological timelines
Articles which contain graphical timelines
2014 EPac T